Lakkidi may refer to:

 Lakkidi, Wayanad, a village in  Kerala, India
 Lakkidi, Palakkad, a village in  Kerala, India
 Lakkidi railway station, Palakkad